The Velodrom (velodrome) is an indoor track cycling arena, in the Prenzlauer Berg locality of Berlin, Germany. Holding up to 12,000 people, it was also Berlin's largest concert venue, until the opening of O2 World in 2008.

It is part of a larger complex, which includes a swimming pool as well, built in the course of the unsuccessful Berlin application for the 2000 Summer Olympics. This project is related to the German reunification and the wish of a city, Berlin, about to become the capital, to be nominated for the Olympic Games.

It replaced the former Werner-Seelenbinder-Halle, which was demolished in 1993. It mainly hosts indoor sporting events, trade shows and concerts.

Architecture
The building was designed by French architect Dominique Perrault who won an international design competition in 1992 and was awarded the German Award of Architecture, second prize for the velodrome and the Olympic swimming pool.
The site chosen is at the intersection of urban elements and of different networks. In order to resolve the conjunction of these two systems, the buildings which house the velodrome and the Olympic Swimming Pool vanish from sight. The idea was to create an orchard of apple trees with two buildings set into the ground, one round and the other rectangular, covered with a wire gauze, which shimmer in the sunlight and appear to be stretches of water more than buildings.

The project includes 
a multi-use velodrome: cycling, athletics, tennis, equestrianism, sports education, concerts
a swimming pool: 2 Olympic pools, Olympic diving platform, pools for diving training, handicapped, children
multisport hall

The arena is famous for its steel roof construction – with a diameter of 142 meters, it has Europe's largest steel roof.

Notable events
In 1998, Janet Jackson performed there during her The Velvet Rope Tour.

In 1999 and 2020, it hosted the UCI Track Cycling World Championships and has been the site of the annual Six Days of Berlin since then.

In 2002 and 2008, Kylie Minogue performed her Fever Tour and KylieX2008 tours.

In 2004, Britney Spears performed a sold-out show of The Onyx Hotel Tour.

In 2007, Daft Punk performed Alive 2006/2007.

In 2014, the Velodrom has been the site of 32nd European Aquatics Championships.

In 2017, cycling European Track Championship took place.

On December 4, 2022, Rosalía will perform a show from her Motomami World Tour.

See also
Max-Schmeling-Halle

References

External links

  

Indoor arenas in Germany
Sports venues in Berlin
Velodromes in Germany
Cycle racing in Germany
Buildings and structures in Pankow